Nocardioides daedukensis is a gram-positive and non-motile bacterium from the genus Nocardioides that has been isolated from soil around a wastewater treatment plant in Taejon, South Korea.

References

External links
Type strain of Nocardioides daedukensis at BacDive -  the Bacterial Diversity Metadatabase	

daedukensis
Bacteria described in 2010